Vaugrigneuse is a commune in the Essonne department in Île-de-France in northern France.

Inhabitants of Vaugrigneuse are known as Valgrigniens.

See also
Communes of the Essonne department

References

External links

Official website 
Mayors of Essonne Association 

Communes of Essonne